SHB Vientiane F.C. (Lao ສະໂມສອນເອັສເຮັສບີ ວຽງຈັນ) was a professional football club based in Laos that played in the Lao League, the highest division in Laotian football. The club played its home matches at the Chao Anouvong Stadium.

History
The club was founded as the Champasak Football Club in 2013 and was bought by the Vietnamese Saigon-Hanoi Commercial Joint Stock Bank (SHB), changing its name to SHB Champasak. The club won the 2013 Lao League.

Invitational tournament record

Honours

Domestic competitions

Lao Premier League: 1
Winners: 2013
Prime Minister's Cup: 1
Winners: 2012

International competitions
Singapore Cup: 1 appearances
2014: Preliminary Round

Affiliated clubs
  SHB Đà Nẵng

References

2013 establishments in Laos
Football clubs in Laos
Association football clubs established in 2013
Financial services association football clubs